Tylothallia verrucosa is a lichen in the family, 
Lecanoraceae. It was first described as Patellaria verrucosa in 1896
by Johannes Müller Argoviensis. 

It is found on a wide range of non-calcareous rocks (including dolerite, granite, mudstone and sandstone), exposed to considerable sea-spray, from sea-level to up to 20 metres above the high tide mark.

References

External links
Tylothallia verrucosa: Images and occurrence data from GBIF

Lecanoraceae
Taxa named by Johannes Müller Argoviensis
Fungi described in 1896
Taxa named by Gintaras Kantvilas